The 1939 King's Birthday Honours in New Zealand, celebrating the official birthday of King George VI, were appointments made by the King to various orders and honours to reward and highlight good works by New Zealanders. They were announced on 7 June 1939.

The recipients of honours are displayed here as they were styled before their new honour.

Order of Saint Michael and Saint George

Companion (CMG)
 Henry Tai Mitchell – of Rotorua. For devoted services on the behalf of native races.
 Arthur Tyndall  – under-secretary of the Mines Department and director of Housing Construction, Wellington

Order of the British Empire

Knight Commander (KBE)
Civil division
 William Blaxland Benham   – emeritus professor of biology, University of Otago.
 Thomas Alexander Hunter  – professor of philosophy and psychology, Victoria College, University of New Zealand.

Commander (CBE)
Civil division
 Norman Edwin Hutchings – assistant under-secretary, Public Works Department, Wellington.

Officer (OBE)
Civil division
 Jane Rhoda Barr  – of Wellington; formerly principal of Timaru Girls' High School.
 Mother Mary Gonzaga – matron of the Mater Misericordiae Hospital, Auckland.
 Colonel William Douthwaite Holgate – of Auckland. For public services.

Military division
 Flight Lieutenant Cyril Eyton Kay – Royal New Zealand Air Force; of Auckland.

Member (MBE)
Civil division
 Teresa Butler – matron of the hospital at Rarotonga, Cook Islands.
 Mary Blythe Law – formerly a teacher at the Institute for the Blind, Auckland.
 Blanche Eleanor Carnachan  – of Auckland. For social welfare services.
 Frank Reed – of Auckland; formerly chief inspector of mines, Mines Department.

Military division
 Commissioned Engineer Albert John Lee – Royal Navy; of Auckland.
 Captain David Nicol – New Zealand Army Ordnance Corps; district ordnance officer, southern military district, Christchurch.

References

Birthday Honours
1939 awards
1939 in New Zealand
New Zealand awards